Bygrave is a village and civil parish in the North Hertfordshire district of Hertfordshire, England. 

Bygrave or Bygraves may also refer to:
 Adam Bygrave (born 1989), English footballer defender
 Joe Bygraves (1931–2012), British heavyweight boxer
 Max Bygraves (1922–2012), English comedian and singer
 Phillip Bygrave (1929–2012), New Zealand field hockey player
 Rose Bygrave (born 1955), Australian singer and songwriter

See also
 Bygrave slide rule, an eponymous slide rule